Chile competed in the 2008 Summer Olympics, held in Beijing, People's Republic of China from August 8 to August 24, 2008.

Medalists

Athletics

Men
Track & road events

Field events

Combined events – Decathlon

Women
Field events

Canoeing

Slalom

Cycling

Road

Track
Omnium

Mountain biking

Equestrian

Eventing

Fencing

Men

Judo

Modern pentathlon

Rowing

Men

Women

Qualification Legend: FA=Final A (medal); FB=Final B (non-medal); FC=Final C (non-medal); FD=Final D (non-medal); FE=Final E (non-medal); FF=Final F (non-medal); SA/B=Semifinals A/B; SC/D=Semifinals C/D; SE/F=Semifinals E/F; QF=Quarterfinals; R=Repechage

Sailing

Men

M = Medal race; EL = Eliminated – did not advance into the medal race; CAN = Race cancelled

Shooting

Men

Swimming

Men

Women

Tennis

Chile had qualified places in both men's singles and men's doubles. After winning the gold medal in Athens, Nicolás Massú received and accepted an invitation from the International Tennis Federation to compete at these Olympic games.

Triathlon

Weightlifting

See also
Chile at the 2007 Pan American Games

References

Nations at the 2008 Summer Olympics
2008
Summer Olympics